Charlot is a Danish, German, Norwegian, and Swedish feminine given name that is an alternate form of Charlotte and a feminine form of Carl as well as the masculine Charlot. Charlot is a French masculine given name that is a diminutive form of Charles and a masculine form of Charlotte. Notable people referred to by this name include the following:

Mononym
 Charlot (rowing) (fl. 1900), French coxswain
Charlot or Chief Charlo (ca. 1830–1910), chief of the Bitterroot Salish

Given name
 Charlot Byj (1920–1983), American artist
 Charlot Jeudy (1984–2019), Haitian activist 
 Charlot Kaské (fl. 1763–1765), Shawnee war chief
 Charlot Salwai (born 1963), Vanuatuan politician

Surname
 André Charlot (1882–1956), French impresario 
 Edmond Charlot (1915–2004), French publisher
 Émmanuel Charlot (born 1966), French water polo player
 Gaston Charlot (1904–1994), French chemist
 Jean Charlot (1898–1979) French-Mexican painter and illustrator
 Joseph Charlot (1827–1871), French composer
 Juli Lynne Charlot (born 1922), American singer, actress and fashion designer
 Monica Charlot (1933–2005), British historian and political scientist
 Monique Pinçon-Charlot (born 1946), French sociologist

Fictional characters
 Charlot, the French, Portuguese, Spanish and Italian name for Charlie Chaplin's character The Tramp

See also

Charcot (disambiguation)
Chariot (disambiguation)
Charlo (name)
Charlos (disambiguation)
Sharlot Hall

Notes

 Danish feminine given names
 French masculine given names
 German feminine given names
 Norwegian feminine given names
 Swedish feminine given names